Nesocharis is a genus of small seed-eating birds in the family Estrildidae. They are found in Africa.

Taxonomy
The genus Nesocharis was introduced in 1903 by the English anthropologist Boyd Alexander with Shelley's oliveback as the type species. The name Nesocharis is a combination of the Ancient Greek nēsos, meaning "island" and kharis, meaning "loveliness". The genus Nesocharis is sister to the waxbills in the genus Coccopygia.

Species
The genus contains two species:

References

 
Bird genera
Estrildidae
 
Taxa named by Boyd Alexander